Granoff may refer to:

Phyllis Granoff, a professor at Yale University;
Jonathan Granoff, president of the Global Security Institute;
Granoff School of Music, a music school in Philadelphia;
Katia Granoff, a French art dealer and writer of Russian émigré origins.